Zawar Hussain Warraich is a Pakistani politician who served as the  Provincial Minister of Punjab for Prisons, in office from 13 September 2018 to 2 November 2020. He had been a member of the Provincial Assembly of the Punjab from August 2018 till May 2022.

Political career

He was elected to the Provincial Assembly of the Punjab as a candidate of Pakistan Tehreek-e-Insaf (PTI) from Constituency PP-224 (Lodhran-I) in 2018 Pakistani general election.

On 12 September 2018, he was inducted into the provincial Punjab cabinet of Chief Minister Sardar Usman Buzdar. On 13 September 2018, he was appointed as Provincial Minister of Punjab for Prisons.

On 2 November 2020, He was removed  from his post of Provincial Minister of Punjab for Prisons.

He de-seated due to vote against party policy for Chief Minister of Punjab election  on 16 April 2022.

References

Living people
Pakistan Tehreek-e-Insaf MPAs (Punjab)
Provincial ministers of Punjab
Year of birth missing (living people)